The Pegasus Quantum is a British two-seat, ultralight trike that was designed and produced by Pegasus Aviation and later by P&M Aviation. The aircraft was supplied as a completed aircraft.

In the early 2000s Pegasus Aviation was merged with rival Mainair Sports into P&M Aviation, and production of the Quantum continued but shifted from the Pegasus plant in Marlborough, Wiltshire, to the Mainair factory in Rochdale. As the company rationalized the two aircraft lines, Quantum production ended. By 2012 the manufacturer indicated, "This aircraft is no longer in production...Full spares and support are still available and will remain so for the foreseeable future. Complete aircraft can still be manufactured but by special request only."

Design and development
The Quantum was intended as an up-scale touring trike for long distance flying. It is also certified to comply with UK BCAR Section "S" and German DULV microlight certification. It features a cable-braced hang glider-style high-wing, weight-shift controls, a two-seats-in-tandem, open cockpit, tricycle landing gear and a single engine in pusher configuration.

The aircraft is made from bolted-together aluminium tubing, with its double-surface Pegasus Q2 wing covered in Dacron sailcloth. Its  span wing is supported by a single tube-type kingpost and uses an "A" frame control bar. The Quantum line includes a number of models that incorporate various options packages and engines.

Operational history
Quantums have been used for a number of record-setting flights, including the first microlight flight around the world, flown by Brian Milton and Keith Reynolds in the Quantum 912 Global Flyer between 14 March - 21 July 1998.

Milton explains why he chose the Quantum at the start of planning for the record-circling flight:

The Quantum was also flown by Simon Baker to win the World Microlight Championships.

Variants
Quantum 503
Standard equipment when delivered included in-flight trim, all-wheel suspension and brakes. Price in 2000 was US$14,000 ready to fly.
Quantum Sport/Quantum 582
Price in 2000 was US$16,500 ready to fly.
Quantum SuperSport/Quantum 912
Price in 2000 was US$30,000 ready to fly.

Specifications (SuperSport)

References

External links

Pegasus Quantum
1990s British ultralight aircraft
Homebuilt aircraft
Single-engined pusher aircraft
Ultralight trikes